The Hamilton Park Historic District is a historic district in the Near East Side of Columbus, Ohio. The site was listed on the National Register of Historic Places in 1983 and the Columbus Register of Historic Properties in 1987. It is one of few remaining examples of an 1880-1930 upper middle class neighborhood in Columbus. The district also contains an unusual street layout, with three parallel streets creating two islands. It is thought to have been one larger island originally, as can be seen on Jefferson Avenue.

See also
 National Register of Historic Places listings in Columbus, Ohio

References

External links
 

National Register of Historic Places in Columbus, Ohio
Historic districts on the National Register of Historic Places in Ohio
1983 establishments in Ohio
Columbus Register properties
Historic districts in Columbus, Ohio
King-Lincoln Bronzeville